The following is a list of football clubs in Kyrgyzstan. The clubs mentioned below are currently competing in the top divisions of the Kyrgyz football league system.

Kyrgyzstan League 
 FC Abdish-Ata Kant
 FC Abdish-Ata-91 previously Abdish-Ata-FShM Kant
 FC Ak-Bura Osh
 FC Ak-Maral Tokmok previously Spartak Tokmok
 FC Ak-Zhol previously Al-Fagir Aravan, Dinamo Aravan, Sharab-K Aravan, Ak-Bula Aravan, Druzhba Aravan, Yangiyul Aravan
 FC Ala-Too Naryn
 FC Alamudun previously Luch Altyn-Taala Alamudun, Dinamo Alamudun
 FC Alay previously Alay-Osh-Pirim, Shakhtyor Osh
 FC Aldiyer Kurshab
 FC Alga Bishkek previously Aviator-AAL Bishkek, SKA-Shoro Bishkek, SKA-PVO Bishkek, Alga-PVO Bishkek, Alga-RIIF Bishkek, Alga Frunze, Spartak Frunze, Iskra Frunze, Trudovye Rezervy Frunze, Zenit Frunze
 FC Alga-2 Bishkek previously Alga Bishkek, Alga-d Frunze
 FC Ata-Spor Bishkek
 FC Bazar-Korgon-Babur
 FC Dinamo Ala-Buka
 FC Dinamo Kant
 FC Dinamo-Manas-SKIF Bishkek previously Shumkar-Dastan Bishkek, Shumkar Bishkek, Shumkar-SKIF Bishkek
 FC Dinamo-Polyot Bishkek previously Dinamo-Erkin Farm Bishkek, Erkin Farm Bishkek, CAG-Dinamo-MVD Bishkek, Dinamo-Oil Bishkek, Dinamo Frunze
 FC Dinamo-UVD Osh previously Dinamo-Alay Osh, Dinamo Osh
 FC Dordoi Bishkek previously Dordoi-Dynamo Naryn, Dordoi-Zhashtyk-SKIF Naryn, Dordoi Naryn
 FC Dordoi-Plaza
 FC Dostuk Uzgen previously Kara-Shoro Uzgen
 FC Dzhalal-Abad previously Asyl Jalal-Abad, Kambar-Ata Jalal-Abad, Doma Ata Jalal-Abad, Dinamo-KPK Jalal-Abad, Dinamo Jalal-Abad, Kokart Jalal-Abad, Khimik Jalal-Abad, Stroitel Jalal-Abad
 FC Ekolog Bishkek
 FC Energetik Karaköl
 FC Instrumentalshchik Bishkek previously Instrumentalshchik Frunze
 FC Issyk-Kol Karakol previously FC Kol-Tor Karakol, FC Karakol
 FC Kant previously Kant-77
 FC Kant-Oil previously Han-Tengri Kant
 FC Kelechek Osh
 FC Khimik Kara-Balta previously Jayil-Baatyr Kara-Balta, Bakay Kara-Balta, KVT Dinamo Kara-Balta, KVT Khimik Kara-Balta
 FC Khimik Suzak
 FC Lokomotiv Jalal-Abad
 FC Manas-Ordo Talas previously Manas-Dinamo Talas, Boo-Terek Talas, Manas Talas, Dinamo-Manas Talas, Namys-APK Talas
 FC Metallurg Kadamjay
 FC Muras-Sport Bishkek
 FC Neftchi Kochkor-Ata previously Neftchi-KPK Kochkor-Ata, Neftchi-KRS Kochkor-Ata
 FC Nookat
 FC Olimpia-85 Bishkek
 FC Orto-Nur Sokuluk previously Frunze Sokuluk, Dinamo Sokuluk, SKA-Dostuk Sokuluk, Dostuk Sokuluk
 FC Pivo Belovodskoye previously Maksat Belovodskoye
 FC Polyot Bishkek previously SC Sverdlovskogo RUVD Bishkek
 FC Rotor Bishkek merger of FC Instrumentalshchik Bishkek and Selmashevets (Torpedo Frunze).
 FC RUOR-Guardia Bishkek previously SKNG Bishkek, National Guard Bishkek, National Guard-AiK Bishkek, AiK Bishkek
 FC Shakhtyor Kyzyl-Kiya previously FC Kyzyl-Kiya, Semetey-Dinamo Kyzyl-Kiya, Semetey Kyzyl-Kiya
 FC Shakhtyor Tashkömür
 FC Sher-Ak-Dan Bishkek previously Sher Bishkek
 FC Shoro Bishkek
 FC SKA-Alay Osh previously Alay-Oshpirim Gulcha, Alay Gulcha
 FC Svetotekhnika Mayli-Su
 Team Kyrgyzstan U-17
 Team Kyrgyzstan U-21
 FC Uchkun Kara-Suu
 FC Zhashtyk-Ak-Altyn Kara-Suu previously Zhashtyk Osh, Ak-Altyn Kara-Suu, Aka-Atyn Kara-Suu

Kyrgyzstan League Second Level 
 FC Nashe Pivo previously Abdish-Ata-2 Kant

External links
 RSSSF
 KLISF
 sport.kg
 Kyrgyzstan 1st level alltimetable 1992–2010

Kyrgyzstan
 
Football clubs
football clubs